Michael Glumac (born April 5, 1980) is a retired Canadian professional ice hockey player who last played as Captain for Croatian hockey club KHL Medveščak Zagreb in the Kontinental Hockey League (KHL). He is of Croatian descent.

Collegiate career 

Glumac played junior hockey for the St. Michael's Buzzers and Newmarket Hurricanes of the Ontario Junior Hockey League before signing to play US college hockey for Miami University in Oxford, Ohio.  Glumac became a fixture for Miami his 4-year collegiate career, voted as team MVP in his senior, 2001–02 season, leading the team in goals (16) scored.

Playing career

Glumac was undrafted out of college, and began his professional career during the 2002–03 season, named to the ECHL All-Rookie Team as a member of the Pee Dee Pride, also winning the ECHL Plus Performer of the Year at +37.  He advanced to the American Hockey League (AHL) with the Worcester IceCats the following year, and signed with the parent team, the St. Louis Blues, on June 29, 2004.

After spending the bulk of the next three seasons with the AHL affiliates of the Blues, Worcester and Peoria Rivermen, Glumac made his NHL debut on January 3, 2006 against the Calgary Flames, recording an assist.  Glumac would see limited time with St. Louis over the next three seasons, posting 7 goals with the Blues while spending the majority of each season with Peoria.

Glumac signed a contract with the Montreal Canadiens on July 16, 2008 and was sent to affiliate, the Hamilton Bulldogs in the AHL, spending two season with Hamilton.

Glumac had joined the Kassel Huskies of the German Deutsche Eishockey-Liga (DEL) on a try-out in 2010. However, due to Kassel unexpectedly folding, he was released and signed to another try-out with the Straubing Tigers. Unsuccessful with the Tigers, Glumac moved on to his third DEL club, Adler Mannheim, and on October 12, 2010, secured a one-year contract.  After leading Mannheim with 17 goals in the 2010–11 season, Glumac was re-signed and would spend three seasons in total with the German club.

On May 24, 2013, Glumac joined newly promoted Croatian club, KHL Medveščak Zagreb of the Kontinental Hockey League on an initial one-year contract, but would spend four seasons in Zagreb.  Glumac retired after the 2016–17 season.

Personal life 

With a degree in finance from Miami University, Glumac now works for an equipment service firm in Charlotte, North Carolina where he lives with his family.

Career statistics

Regular season and playoffs

International

References

External links

1980 births
Adler Mannheim players
Canadian ice hockey right wingers
Canadian people of Croatian descent
Cleveland Barons (2001–2006) players
Hamilton Bulldogs (AHL) players
Ice hockey people from Ontario
KHL Medveščak Zagreb players
Living people
Miami RedHawks men's ice hockey players
Pee Dee Pride players
Peoria Rivermen (AHL) players
St. Louis Blues players
Sportspeople from Niagara Falls, Ontario
Undrafted National Hockey League players
Worcester IceCats players
Croatian ice hockey right wingers
Canadian expatriate ice hockey players in Croatia
Canadian expatriate ice hockey players in Germany